Below is the list of populated places in Bilecik Province, Turkey by the districts. In the following lists first place in each list is the administrative center of the district.

Bilecik 
Bilecik
Abadiye, Bilecik
Abbaslık, Bilecik
Ahmetpınar, Bilecik
Alpağut, Bilecik
Aşağıköy, Bilecik
Ayvacık, Bilecik
Bahçecik, Bilecik
Başköy, Bilecik
Bayırköy, Bilecik
Bekdemir, Bilecik
Beyce, Bilecik
Cumalı, Bilecik
Çakırpınar, Bilecik
Çamkoru, Bilecik
Çavuşköy, Bilecik
Çukurören, Bilecik
Deresakarı, Bilecik
Dereşemsettin, Bilecik
Elmabahçe, Bilecik
Erkoca, Bilecik
Gökpınar, Bilecik
Hasandere, Bilecik
İkizce, Bilecik
İlyasbey, Bilecik
İlyasça, Bilecik
Kapaklı, Bilecik
Karaağaç, Bilecik
Kavaklı, Bilecik
Kendirli, Bilecik
Kepirler, Bilecik
Kınık, Bilecik
Kızıldamlar, Bilecik
Koyunköy, Bilecik
Kurtköy, Bilecik
Kuyubaşı, Bilecik
Künceğiz, Bilecik
Küplü, Bilecik
Necmiyeköy, Bilecik
Okluca, Bilecik
Ören, Bilecik
Pelitözü, Bilecik
Sarmaşık, Bilecik
Selbükü, Bilecik
Selöz, Bilecik
Sütlük, Bilecik
Şükraniye, Bilecik
Taşçılar, Bilecik
Ulupınar, Bilecik
Vezirhan, Bilecik
Yeniköy, Bilecik

Bozüyük
Bozüyük
Akçapınar, Bozüyük
Akpınar, Bozüyük
Aksutekke, Bozüyük
Alibeydüzü, Bozüyük
Aşağıarmutlu, Bozüyük
Bozalan, Bozüyük
Camiliyayla, Bozüyük
Cihangazi, Bozüyük
Çamyayla, Bozüyük
Çaydere, Bozüyük
Çokçapınar, Bozüyük
Darıdere, Bozüyük
Delielmacık, Bozüyük
Dodurga, Bozüyük
Dombayçayırı, Bozüyük
Dübekli, Bozüyük
Düzağaç, Bozüyük
Düzdağ, Bozüyük
Eceköy, Bozüyük
Erikli, Bozüyük
Gökçeli, Bozüyük
Göynücek, Bozüyük
Günyarık, Bozüyük
Hamidiye, Bozüyük
Kandilli, Bozüyük
Kapanalan, Bozüyük
Karaağaç, Bozüyük
Karabayır, Bozüyük
Karaçayır, Bozüyük
Ketenlik, Bozüyük
Kızılcapınar, Bozüyük
Kızıltepe, Bozüyük
Kovalıca, Bozüyük
Kozpınar, Bozüyük
Kuyupınar, Bozüyük
Metristepe, Bozüyük
Muratdere, Bozüyük
Ormangüzle, Bozüyük
Osmaniye, Bozüyük
Poyra, Bozüyük
Revnak, Bozüyük
Saraycık, Bozüyük
Yeniçepni, Bozüyük
Yenidodurga, Bozüyük
Yeniüreğil, Bozüyük
Yeşilçukurca, Bozüyük

Gölpazarı

Gölpazarı
Akçakavak, Gölpazarı
Aktaş, Gölpazarı
Alıç, Gölpazarı
Arıcaklar, Gölpazarı
Armutçuk, Gölpazarı
Baltalı, Gölpazarı
Bayat, Gölpazarı
Bolatlı, Gölpazarı
Büyükbelen, Gölpazarı
Büyüksusuz, Gölpazarı
Büyüksürmeli, Gölpazarı
Çengeller, Gölpazarı
Çımışkı, Gölpazarı
Çiftlik, Gölpazarı
Çukurören, Gölpazarı
Demirhanlar, Gölpazarı
Derecikören, Gölpazarı
Dereli, Gölpazarı
Doğancılar, Gölpazarı
Dokuz, Gölpazarı
Gökçeler, Gölpazarı
Gökçeözü, Gölpazarı
Göldağı, Gölpazarı
Gözaçanlar, Gölpazarı
Hacıköy, Gölpazarı
Hamidiye, Gölpazarı
İncirli, Gölpazarı
Karaağaç, Gölpazarı
Karaahmetler, Gölpazarı
Karacalar, Gölpazarı
Kasımlar, Gölpazarı
Kavak, Gölpazarı
Keskin, Gölpazarı
Köprücek, Gölpazarı
Kurşunlu, Gölpazarı
Kuşçuören, Gölpazarı
Küçüksusuz, Gölpazarı
Küçükyenice, Gölpazarı
Kümbet, Gölpazarı
Sarıhacılar, Gölpazarı
Softalar, Gölpazarı
Söğütcük, Gölpazarı
Şahinler, Gölpazarı
Taşçıahiler, Gölpazarı
Tongurlar, Gölpazarı
Türkmen, Gölpazarı
Üyük, Gölpazarı
Üzümlü, Gölpazarı

İnhisar

İnhisar
Akköy, İnhisar
Çayköy, İnhisar
Harmanköy, İnhisar
Hisarcık, İnhisar
Koyunlu, İnhisar
Muratça, İnhisar
Samrı, İnhisar
Tarpak, İnhisar
Tozman, İnhisar

Osmaneli 

Osmaneli
Adliye, Osmaneli
Ağlan, Osmaneli
Akçapınar, Osmaneli
Avdan, Osmaneli
Balçıkhisar, Osmaneli
Belenalan, Osmaneli
Bereket, Osmaneli
Borcak, Osmaneli
Boyunkaya, Osmaneli
Büyükyenice, Osmaneli
Ciciler, Osmaneli
Çerkeşli, Osmaneli
Çiftlik, Osmaneli
Dereyörük, Osmaneli
Düzmeşe, Osmaneli
Ericek, Osmaneli
Günüören, Osmaneli
Hisarcık, Osmaneli
Kazancı, Osmaneli
Kızılöz, Osmaneli
Medetli, Osmaneli
Oğulpaşa, Osmaneli
Orhaniye, Osmaneli
Sarıyazı, Osmaneli
Selçik, Osmaneli
Selimiye, Osmaneli
Soğucakpınar, Osmaneli

Pazaryeri 

Pazaryeri
Ahmetler, Pazaryeri
Alınca, Pazaryeri
Arapdede, Pazaryeri
Arpadere, Pazaryeri
Bahçesultan, Pazaryeri
Bozcaarmut, Pazaryeri
Bulduk, Pazaryeri
Burçalık, Pazaryeri
Büyükelmalı, Pazaryeri
Demirköy, Pazaryeri
Dereköy, Pazaryeri
Dülgeroğlu, Pazaryeri
Esemen, Pazaryeri
Fıranlar, Pazaryeri
Güde, Pazaryeri
Gümüşdere, Pazaryeri
Günyurdu, Pazaryeri
Karadede, Pazaryeri
Karaköy, Pazaryeri
Kınık, Pazaryeri
Küçükelmalı, Pazaryeri
Nazifpaşa, Pazaryeri
Sarıdayı, Pazaryeri
Sarnıç, Pazaryeri

Söğüt 

Söğüt
Akçasu, Söğüt
Borcak, Söğüt
Çaltı, Söğüt
Dereboyu, Söğüt
Dömez, Söğüt
Dudaş, Söğüt*Geçitli, Söğüt
Gündüzbey, Söğüt
Hamitabat, Söğüt
Hayriye, Söğüt
Kayabalı, Söğüt
Kepen, Söğüt
Kızılsaray, Söğüt
Küre, Söğüt
Oluklu, Söğüt
Ortaca, Söğüt
Rızapaşa, Söğüt
Savcıbey, Söğüt
Sırhoca, Söğüt
Tuzaklı, Söğüt
Yakacık, Söğüt
Yeşilyurt, Söğüt
Zemzemiye, Söğüt

Yenipazar 

Yenipazar
Aşağıboğaz, Yenipazar
Aşağıçaylı, Yenipazar
Batıbelenören, Yenipazar
Belkese, Yenipazar
Caferler, Yenipazar
Danişment, Yenipazar
Dereköy, Yenipazar, Bilecik
Doğubelenören, Yenipazar
Esenköy, Yenipazar
Karahasanlar, Yenipazar
Katran, Yenipazar
Kavacık, Yenipazar
Kösüre, Yenipazar
Kuşça, Yenipazar
Kükürt, Yenipazar
Nasuhlar, Yenipazar
Selim, Yenipazar
Sorguncukahiler, Yenipazar
Tohumlar, Yenipazar
Ulucak, Yenipazar
Yukarıboğaz, Yenipazar
Yukarıçaylı, Yenipazar
Yumaklı, Yenipazar

References

List
Bilecik
List